Psychotoxic is a 2004 first-person shooter video game for Microsoft Windows developed by NuClearVision Entertainment and published by Vidis and Whiptail Interactive.

Development 

The game's development began in 2001 and was to be published by CDV Software. CDV abandoned the project and it was picked up by Vidis for Germany, Austria and Russia and later by Whiptail Interactive for the rest of the world.

Reception 

The game holds a "generally unfavorable" review score of 40 based on 15 critic reviews on the review aggregate Metacritic.

Reviews 

 PC Gamer (UK) #147
 PC Gamer (US) #137
 Computer Gaming World #253
 PC Zone # PC Review: Psychotoxic
 PC Gamer June 2005
 GameSpot
 IGN
 4Players (German)
 GameZone (DE) (German)
 Igromania (Russian)
 Shacknews - Psychotoxic Interview

References 

First-person shooters
Video games developed in Germany
Single-player video games
Windows games
Windows-only games
2004 video games